Zia Mody (born 19 July 1956) is an Indian corporate lawyer and businesswoman. Zia is the daughter of Soli Sorabjee, a former Attorney General of India.

A founding partner of AZB & Partners, one of India's leading law firms, Zia is one of India's foremost corporate attorneys. She has been recognized for her contribution to the legal world, both in India and internationally. She has worked with G.E., Tata Group, Reliance Industries, Aditya Birla Group and the Vedanta Group. She also advises large private equity houses including KKR, Bain Capital and Warburg Pincus. She is ranked #1 in the most powerful women entrepreneurs by Fortune India in 2018 and 2019.

Biography
Mody's initial education was at Elphinstone College, Mumbai. She studied law at Selwyn College, Cambridge, followed by a master's degree from Harvard Law School in 1979. She passed the New York State Bar examination and qualified as an attorney in the State of New York. She worked for five years with Baker & McKenzie in New York City, before returning to India. Her husband, business tycoon Jaydev Mody, is the chairman of Delta Corp. They live in Mumbai, Maharashtra and have three daughters, Anjali, Aarti and Aditi.

She started her own practice in Mumbai in 1984, which she merged twice with other firms to form AZB & Partners, one of India's largest law firms, where she is the managing partner. She has been featured in the Forbes list of "Power Women in Business" and in the Top 50 Most Powerful Women list published by Fortune India. She is a Baháʼí by religion.

Achievements

Zia is recommended for M&A, Securities Law, Private Equity and Project Finance in the RSG India Report, 2017. Clients commended Zia as "one of India's foremost corporate attorneys", "Problem solver", "meticulous", "thorough", "result oriented", and having a "quick grasp". Clients also commented that she is easily 'accessible'. She was recognized as a Top 13 female Acritas Star globally by Acritas Star 2018 and recognized as a "Leading Lawyer", one of the 300 leading female transactional experts by IFLR1000 Women Leaders 2018. Zia Mody is classified as a "Leading Individual" for Banking & Finance, Corporate and M&A and Investment Funds in The Legal 500 Asia-Pacific 2018. She won "Professional of the Year - 2017" at the inaugural UK India Awards. She has also been termed "Market Leader" for Mergers & Acquisitions by IFLR1000 Financial & Corporate Guide 2018 and "Market Leading Lawyer" for Corporate/M&A by AsiaLaw Profiles 2016 to 2018.

Her other awards include: "India Managing Partner of the Year – 2016" by Asian Legal Business (Thomson Reuters); Leading Individual for Banking, Finance, Corporate and M&A and Investment Funds in the Legal 500 Asia-Pacific 2016; Star Individual for Corporate / M&A; Band 1 lawyer for Banking & Finance 2012 to 2016; Band 1 lawyer for Private Equity 2012 to 2015 by Chambers and Partners Global. She won the Lifetime Achievement Award at the Euromoney Asia Women in Business Law Awards 2015.

Business Today listed Mody as one of the 25 most powerful businesswomen in India several times from September 2004 through 2011. She is a recipient of the Financial Express Knowledge Professional of the Year Award. She was also named one of India's 100 Most Powerful CEOs by The Economic Times in 2004 and 2006. She is also the recipient of the Economic Times Awards for Corporate Excellence as the Businesswoman of the Year, 2010. The awards are given out every year and are seen as the foremost authority in recognizing excellence in the Indian corporate market.

Memberships and Affiliations 
Zia Mody serves as the Deputy Chairman and as Director of the Hong Kong & Shanghai Banking Corporation, Hong Kong. She is also a Member of the Governing Board of the International Council for Commercial Arbitration (ICCA). She is a designated Foreign Arbitrator in the Panel of Arbitrators of China International Economic and Trade Arbitration Commission (CIETAC) and is also a member of the CII National Council. Zia was also on the panel of the expert committee set up by the Law Commission of India on 'Amendment to the Arbitration and Conciliation Act, 1996' to review the provisions of the Act in view of the several inadequacies observed in the functioning of the Act (2014) and a member of the Reserve Bank of India Committee on Comprehensive Financial Services for Small Businesses and Low-Income Households (chaired by Dr. Nachiket Mor – 2013). Her other memberships include the Godrej Committee on Corporate Governance set up by the Ministry of Corporate Affairs (2012) and the World Bank Administrative Tribunal, Washington D.C. (2008-2013). She also served as the Vice President and Member of the London Court of International Arbitration (LCIA) (2010 -2013) and as the Deputy Chairman and Non-executive Director of HSBC Asia-Pacific Board.

Charitable Work 
Zia Mody's charity almost entirely goes to the Baha’i fund. However, she has also contributed to Jai Vakeel Foundation.

References

1956 births
Living people
Parsi people from Mumbai
Businesspeople from Mumbai
Indian Bahá'ís
21st-century Bahá'ís
Harvard Law School alumni
Businesswomen from Maharashtra
Scholars from Mumbai
Alumni of Selwyn College, Cambridge
20th-century Indian businesswomen
20th-century Indian businesspeople
21st-century Indian businesswomen
21st-century Indian businesspeople
20th-century Indian lawyers
20th-century Indian women lawyers
21st-century Indian lawyers
21st-century Indian women lawyers